A-Plus may refer to:
 A-Plus (store), an American convenience store chain
 A-Plus (rapper), American rapper and producer
 A-Plus TV, a Pakistani entertainment TV channel
 Aqil Davidson, or A-Plus, American lyricist, hip-hop artist, and record producer

See also
 A+ (disambiguation)